Public holidays in Somaliland are based on two official calendar systems: the Gregorian calendar primarily, and the Islamic lunar calendar for religious holidays.

See also
Public holidays in Djibouti
Public holidays in Somalia

References

Somali culture
Society of Somalia
Events in Somaliland
Somaliland
Somaliland